Raja (born 9 April 1971), known professionally as Vignesh, is an Indian actor who predominantly works in Tamil cinema.

Career

Vignesh got selected to play the lead role in Balu Mahendra's Vanna Vanna Pookkal (1992) but he was removed from the film after working on it for seven days and was replaced by Prashanth. He made his acting debut in 1992 with the village drama film Chinna Thayee. In 1993, he acted in Amma Ponnu, Bharathiraja's Kizhakku Cheemayile and Kathir's Uzhavan. In 1995, Vignesh appeared in six films. He starred in Chellakannu, which told the tragic story of a young couple caught between feuding families, and the film performed well and ran for over one hundred days at the box office. The film had featured him alongside actress Yuvarani, as did Pasumpon, while his Nadodi Mannan became a box office failure.

In the mid of 1990s, Vignesh's housemate Bala, an erstwhile assistant of Balu Mahendra wrote the script of the film Sethu, then titled Akhilan, and offered him the film's lead role. The film was shelved due to financial constraints. In 1997, director Bala restarted the project and Vignesh, who was busy with other commitments, was replaced by Vikram. In 1998, Vignesh played the lead role in J. Suresh's Velai and played a supporting role in Ravichandran's Kannedhirey Thondrinal. The following years, Vignesh played the lead role in low-budget films Pudhu Kudithanam (1999) and Nee Enthan Vaanam (2000), and played supporting roles in Suyamvaram (1999) and Appu (2000).

After a hiatus of 3 years, Vignesh made a comeback with Soori (2003). For Soori, Vignesh had to tonsure his head for 70 times. His performance received mixed reviews with critics claiming that Vignesh "tends to go slightly overboard, especially when he howls aloud in agony" and "his cries seem over the top". 2003 saw the release of his long-delayed films Ennai Thalatta Varuvala and Vani Mahal. The three films went unnoticed at box office, post-release Vignesh signed two projects titled "Ilango" and "Parithi" with both failing to proceed after launch. In 2005, Vignesh appeared in two low-budget films: Ulla Kadathal and Aadhikkam. Vignesh then produced and acted in the gangster film Aacharya (2006) and a critic stated, "for Vignesh, it is a comeback vehicle and he has done his best". Some of the latest projects, he's been a part of are Avan Aval (2016), Anbukku Panjamillai (2016) and Aaruthra (2018).

In 2020, he also marks the Tamil serial debut with Poove Unakkaga broadcast by Sun TV.

Filmography

All films are in Tamil, unless otherwise noted.

Television

References

Tamil male actors
Indian male film actors
Male actors from Tamil Nadu
People from Erode district
Living people
1971 births
Male actors in Tamil cinema